1972 in professional wrestling describes the year's events in the world of professional wrestling.

List of notable promotions 
These promotions held notable shows in 1972.

Calendar of notable shows

Notable events
January 12  Antonio Inoki created New Japan Pro-Wrestling
October 21 Giant Baba created All Japan Pro Wrestling

Awards and honors

Pro Wrestling Illustrated

Championship changes

EMLL

NWA

Births

 January 8 - Jon Andersen 
 January 10 – Brian Christopher(died in 2018) 
 January 19 – Ron Killings
 January 20 - Tony DeVito 
 January 24 - Fabián el Gitano (died in 2011)
 February 1 - Sean Casey 
 February 8 – Big Show
 February 19 – Francine
 February 28 - Angel Medina 
 March 1 - Último Guerrero
 March 6 - Shaquille O'Neal 
 March 7 - Major Gunns 
 March 12 – Nunzio
 March 21 – Chris Candido (died in 2005) 
 March 23 - Octagoncito (AAA)
 March 27 – Charlie Haas
 April 11:
Balls Mahoney (died in 2016) 
Kevin Quinn 
Fyre 
 April 14 - Julio Dinero 
 April 21 - Dr. Cerebro 
 April 28 - Violent J 
 April 29 - Masahito Kakihara 
 May 2 – Dwayne Johnson
 May 4 - Ray González 
 May 17 - Masakazu Fukuda (died in 2000)
 May 25 – Ricky Banderas
 June 2 - Gary Williams 
 June 5 - Mike Bucci
 June 12 - Jack Doan 
 June 28: 
Jon Heidenreich 
Daniel Gracie 
 June 29 – Canyon Ceman
 June 30 - Wolf (died in 2011)
 July 5 - Tatsuhito Takaiwa 
 July 13 – X-Pac
 July 21 - Shinjiro Otani
 August 1 – D-Von Dudley
 August 5 - Ikuto Hidaka 
 August 19 - Sign Guy Dudley 
 August 25 - David Young 
 August 27 – The Great Khali
 September 1 - Doug Williams
 September 3 - Bob Evans 
 September 5 - Shane Sewell 
 September 15 - 
Lady Victoria 
Chad Austin
 September 17 – Phantasio
 September 26 - Gabe Sapolsky 
 October 4 - Otto Schwanz
 October 12 - Karen Jarrett 
 October 16 - Lizmark Jr. 
 October 23 - Jasmin St. Claire 
 November 7 - Chip Fairway (died in 2011) 
 November 14 – Albert
 November 29 - Minoru Tanaka   
 November 30 - Ruffy Silverstein (Canadian wrestler) 
 December 6 – El Oriental
 December 7 – Tammy Lynn Sytch
 December 20 - Takeshi Rikio 
 December 31 - Ryan Sakoda (d. 2021)

Debuts
February 1, 1972–El Texano
March 13, 1972–Rick Martel
March 16, 1972–Gran Hamada
March 20, 1972–Mr. Pogo
May 22, 1972–Moondog King
August 2, 1972–Kengo Kimura
August 23, 1972-Bob Orton Jr.
September 1, 1972–Larry Zbyszko
September–Jaque Mate
November 12, 1972–Yoshiaki Fujiwara
December 1, 1972–Bruce Hart
December 3, 1972–Kuniaki Kobayashi
December 10, 1972–Ric Flair
December 28, 1972–Jim Brunzell
Debut date uncertain
Al Madril
Austin Idol
Ax
Big John Studd
Bobby Jaggers
El Canek
Clem Turner
Dutch Mantell
Colonel DeBeers
George Wells
The Iron Sheik
Ken Patera
Mike Graham
Pez Whatley
Pierre Lefebvre
Scott Casey
Sgt. Slaughter
Smith Hart
Steve Keirn

Retirements
 Johnny Barend (1949 – 1972)
 Angelo Savoldi (1937 – 1972)

Deaths
 February 21 – Luther Lindsay 47
 August 1 – Ray Gunkel 48
September 15 - Billy Sandow, 88
October 7 - Whitey Caldwell 37

References

 
professional wrestling